The 2007 Damallsvenskan was the 20th season of the Damallsvenskan. Matches were played between 11 April and 3 November 2007, with a break due to the 2007 FIFA Women's World Cup. Umeå IK won the title for the sixth time, and third time in a row.   Djurgården finished second, nine points behind. 

The previous season, Falköpings KIK and AIK Fotboll (women) were promoted. Falköpings KIK were relegated again, together with QBIK.

References

Damallsvenskan seasons